Scotstoun Marine Ltd was a shipbuilding company in Glasgow, Scotland, on the River Clyde, formed in 1972 to operate the former shipyard of Charles Connell and Company following the collapse of Upper Clyde Shipbuilders into which it had been amalgamated. Scotstoun Marine Ltd operated as a subsidiary of Govan Shipbuilders. The yard constructed 15 ships between 1972 and 1980 when the yard closed after 119 years of shipbuilding in which 535 ships had been built.

The site was cleared of craneage although some evidence of the building berths remained visible until ca 2004. Part of the yard's covered facilities are utilized by steel stockholders GKN whilst the riverside berth has been utilised by Motherwell Bridge Engineering for heavy fabrication work.

References

External links
   The Clyde-built ships data base - lists over 22,000 ships built on the Clyde

Defunct shipbuilding companies of Scotland